Nandigram is a census town in the Nandigram I Community Development Block of the Haldia subdivision in the Purba Medinipur district of the Indian state of West Bengal.

In 2007, the West Bengal government allowed the Salim Group to set up a chemical hub at Nandigram under the special economic zone policy. This led to resistance by the villagers resulting in clashes with the police that left 14 villagers dead, and resulted in accusations of police brutality.

Geography

Police station
Nandigram's police station has jurisdiction over the Nandigram I and Nandigram II community development blocks. Nandigram's police station covers an area of 251.25 km2 with a population of 279,285.

Urbanisation
79.19% of the Haldia subdivision's population lives in rural areas. Only 20.81% of the population lives in urban areas, and that is the highest proportion of urban population amongst the four subdivisions in the Purba Medinipur district.

Note: The map alongside presents some of the notable locations in the subdivision. All places marked in the map are linked in the larger full screen map.

Demographics
According to the 2011 Census of India, Nandigram had a total population of 5,803 of which 2,947 (51%) were males and 2,856 (49%) were females. There were 725 people below the age of 6. The total number of literate people in Nandigram was 4,512 (88.85% of the population over 6 years old).

Infrastructure
According to the District Census Handbook 2011, Nandigram covered an area of 2.5577 km2. The town had 25 streetlights, 490 domestic electric connections, 4 medicine shops, 5 primary schools, 2 middle schools, 2 secondary schools, a senior secondary school and a college.

Notable people

Although this part of Bengal has not been actively highlighted in Indian history during the British period, the area had been a part of active politics from the British era. With the help of the people of Nandigram, "Tamluk" was freed from the British by Bhupal Chandra Panda, Ajoy Mukherjee, Sushil Kumar Dhara, Satish Chandra Samanta and their friends for a few days (which is the only part of modern India to be freed twice), before India gained independence in 1947.

In post-Independent India, Nandigram had been a centre of learning and played a major part in the development of Haldia, a satellite town of Calcutta (Kolkata). Fresh vegetables, rice and fish are supplied to Haldia from Nandigram. The Ganga (Bhagirathi) and Haldi (downstream of Kanshabati) cover the edges of Nandigram, and the land is fertilized by both the rivers.

Controversies

Health
In March 2001, Nandigram II Block of Medinipur District claimed to have achieved full toilet coverage in the entire block.

Transport

There is no rail connection directly to Nandigram, and roadways are moderately developed.  Buses, jitney trekkers and van rickshaws are the primary public vehicles inside the villages.

The nearest railway station is Mograjpur, connecting from Digha - Tamluk. The nearest busy bus stop is in Math Chandipur. 5-7 direct buses are available from the Howrah station and 2 from Esplanade while other direct buses come from Digha, Haldia, Geonkhali, and Mecheda. Tekkers come every 30 minutes at (Math) Chandipur.

Nandigram is connected to Haldia by a ferry. This ferry service is an important mode of transport for farmers and small traders from Nandigram, who use this service to reach Haldia's market to sell their commodities. Haldia Municipality runs this ferry service.

Within the village, houses are not very close to each other so people have to walk long distances, as van rickshaws are incapable of traveling on the small mud roads.

Education

The area has a college - Sitananda College, also known as Nandigram College, affiliated to Vidyasagar University. There are several other schools in Nandigram, including Asadtala Binode Vidyapith, Debipur Milan Vidyapith, Nandigram BMT Siksha Niketan, Nandigram Girls' High School, Banamali Sikshaniketan, Ryapara Girls' High School, Khodam Bari Higher Secondary School, Nandigram Sitananda College, Samsadad Dhanyakhola Vidyapith, Rajaram Chak siksha Niketan, Mahammadpur Sibnarayan Sikshayatan, Manuchak Milan Vidyapith, Durgapur High School, Kultolia Balika Vidyapith, Narayan Chak High School, Akandabari High School, Daudpur Siksha Sadan (high school), Amdabad High School, and Nibedita Girls High School.

Healthcare
Nandigram Rural Hospital (with 30 beds) is the main medical facility in Nandigram. There are two primary health centres in Nandigram, and they are Mohammadpur PO Nilpur (with 10 beds) and Mahespur PO Parulbari (with 6 beds).

See also
Accumulation by dispossession
Primitive accumulation of capital
Common land

References

Purba Medinipur district
Cities and towns in Purba Medinipur district